The Wigan Warriors play Rugby League in Wigan, England. Their 2017 season results in the Super League XXII, 2017 Challenge Cup, and 2017 World Club Series are shown below.

World Club Series

As winners of the 2016 Super League Grand Final, Wigan Warriors qualified for the 2017 World Club Series. The game saw them play Cronulla-Sutherland Sharks whom they beat providing the Super League's first ever win in the World Club Series era of the tournament.

Super League

Wigan's Super League form was relatively poor during the 2017 season. The year was the first time they had lost ten more games since 2009, and the first time they had failed to qualify for the play-offs since 2006.

Regular season

Matches

Table

Super 8s

Matches

Table

Challenge Cup

As a "Super 8s" team of the 2016 Super League, Wigan Warriors entered the 2017 Challenge Cup in the sixth round where they beat Championship's Swinton Lions. The quarter finals saw them beat local rivals Warrington Wolves by a single point. In the semi-finals Warriors beat Salford Red Devils, before finishing runners-up at Wembley to Hull F.C. The final was their first final since 2013.

References

Wigan Warriors seasons
2017 in English rugby league